Banger Films is a Canadian film and television production company, which specializes in documentary films and television series on music and culture. The company was launched in 2004 by Scot McFadyen and Sam Dunn to create and distribute their first film, Metal: A Headbanger's Journey.

The company has since produced theatrical documentaries and television series, as well as live concert DVDs by rock and heavy metal musicians.

In 2011, Banger Films started a YouTube channel, Bangertv. Most of the channel's content for the first four years of its existence were interviews and trailers of documentaries. Starting in 2015, Bangertv started making album reviews (including tag team/no beef reviews) and hosting weekly live streams. They have since also started a "Best of" series for certain years in the history of Heavy Metal. As of February 2022, Bangertv has 334,000 subscribers.

The company's 2014 film Super Duper Alice Cooper won the Canadian Screen Award for Best Feature Length Documentary at the 3rd Canadian Screen Awards in 2015.

On September 10, 2021, Triumph: Rock & Roll Machine debuted at the 2021 Toronto International Film Festival.

Filmography

References

Film production companies of Canada
Companies based in Toronto
2004 establishments in Ontario
Entertainment companies established in 2004